Sergei Yakovlevich Efron (8 October 1893 – 11 September 1941) was a Russian poet, White Army officer, and the husband of fellow poet Marina Tsvetaeva. While in exile, he was recruited by the Soviet NKVD. After returning to the USSR from France, he was executed.

Family life
Sergei was born in Moscow. He was the sixth of nine children born to Elizaveta Durnovo (1853–1910) and Yakov Konstantinovich Efron (1854–1909). Both were Russian revolutionaries and members of the Black Repartition. Yakov worked as an insurance agent and died of cancer in 1909. The following year, Elizaveta found one of her sons had committed suicide and soon after that day, killed herself. Yakov was from a Jewish family, while Elizaveta came from a line of Russian nobility and merchants; Yakov converted to the Lutheran faith to marry Elizaveta.

Efron contracted tuberculosis as a teenager and his mental and physical health was strained further upon learning of his mother's death. After becoming a student at Moscow University, Sergei volunteered for the military as a male nurse. Due to his poor health, though, he was unable to serve in that capacity. Instead, he enrolled in the officer cadet academy.

When Efron was a 17-year-old cadet in the officers' academy, he met 19-year-old Marina Tsvetaeva on 5 May 1911 at Koktebel ("Blue Height"), a well-known Crimean haven for writers, poets and artists. They fell in love and were married in January 1912. While they had an intense relationship, Tsvetaeva had affairs, such as those with Osip Mandelstam and a poetess Sofia Parnok.

Tsvetaeva and her husband spent summers in the Crimea until the revolution. They had two daughters: Ariadna, or Alya, (born 1912) and Irina (born 1917), and one son, Georgy.

Russian revolution and civil war
Efron volunteered for the military in 1914 and by 1917 he was an officer stationed in Moscow with the 56th Reserve. In October 1917, he participated in the battles with the Bolsheviks in Moscow, then he joined the White Army and participated in the Ice March and defense of the Crimea, while Marina returned to Moscow hoping to be reunited with her husband. During that time, though, the relationship between Efron and Tsvetaeva was severely strained with very little communication between the two. Efron was particularly disenchanted with what he felt was a revolution largely unsupported by the Russian people, the expression of which inspired Tsvetaeva's Daybreak on the Rails.

She was trapped in Moscow for five years, where there was a terrible famine. The Moscow famine was to exact a toll on Tsvetaeva. Starvation and worry were to erode her looks. With no immediate family to turn to, she had no way to support herself or her daughters. In 1919, she placed both her daughters in a state orphanage, mistakenly believing that they would be better fed there. Alya became ill and Tsvetaeva removed her but Irina died there of starvation in 1920.

Post civil war
At the end of the civil war, Efron emigrated to Berlin. There, in May 1922, Efron was reunited in Berlin with his wife, Tsvetaeva, and daughter Ariadna who had left the Soviet Union. In August 1922, the family moved to Prague. Living in unremitting poverty, unable to afford living accommodation in Prague itself, with Efron studying politics and sociology at the Charles University and living in hostels, Tsvetaeva and Ariadna found rooms in a village outside the city. She writes "we are devoured by coal, gas, the milkman, the baker... the only meat we eat is horse-meat".

In summer 1924, Efron and Tsvetaeva left Prague for the suburbs, living for a while in Jíloviště, before moving on to Všenory, where Tsvetaeva conceived their son, Georgy, whom she was to later nickname 'Mur'. He was a difficult child but Tsetaeva loved him obsessively. With Efron now rarely free from tuberculosis, their daughter Ariadna was relegated to the role of the mother's helper and confidante, and consequently felt robbed of much of her childhood.

In 1925, the family settled in Paris, where they would live for the next 14 years. During this time Tsvetaeva contracted tuberculosis.

While residing in Prague, Efron became associated with the Eurasianists and became one of their leaders. In 1926 he and his family moved to Paris where he edited the journal of the Eurasianists and became one of the representatives of the "left Eurasianist" trend which was openly sympathetic to the Soviet Union. In 1929, the Eurasianists were divided and their journal ceased to be published.

NKVD agent 
While still in Paris, Efron was homesick for Russia. He was afraid because of his past as a White soldier. Eventually, either out of idealism or to garner acceptance for his repatriation from the Communists, he began spying for the NKVD, the forerunner of the KGB, and in doing so was established in a dacha, a safe house in the countryside. Alya shared his Stalinist views, and increasingly turned against her mother. In 1937, she returned to the Soviet Union. Later that year, Efron too had to return to USSR. In September 1937, an investigation by French and Swiss police implicated Efron in the murder of former NKVD spymaster and defector Ignace Reiss (also known as Ignaty Reyss and Ignatz Reiss), on a country lane near Lausanne, Switzerland.

After defecting and then criticizing Stalin and Yezhov, Soviet spy Reiss promised not to reveal any state security secrets and fled with his wife and child to the remote village of Finhaut, Valais canton, Switzerland, to hide. After they had been hiding for a month, they were contacted by refugee member of the Communist Party of Germany Gertrude Schildbach under orders from Roland Lyudvigovich Abbiate, alias Francois Rossi, alias Vladimir Pravdin, codename LETCHIK ("Pilot"), a Russian expatriate, citizen of Monaco, and a Soviet NKVD agent. Schildbach wrote to Reiss to request a meeting and ask his advice. On 4 September 1937, Reiss agreed to meet Schildbach in Lausanne. Reiss, who was using using the alias Eberhardt, was lured by Gertrude Schildbach onto a side road near Lausanne where Roland Abbiate was waiting for him with a Soviet PPD-34 sub-machine gun. Reiss was hit by fifteen bullets from Abbiate's sub-machine gun and was killed instantly. The two then dumped Reiss's body on the side of the road. Schildbach was never seen again.

Efron was allegedly in the car with the two assassins. He was also named to be an NKVD spymaster and to be running a "Union for Repatriation" office as a cover for recruiting NKVD operatives from within the Russian community in Paris. A police search of both the office and Efron's flat, however, yielded no evidence.

After Efron fled Paris, the police interrogated Tsvetaeva at the Paris Surete Nationale headquarters on 22 October 1937. She was confused by their questions, answered incoherently, but is quoted as saying that in September he had been fighting in Spain and that "His trust might have been abused—my trust in him remains unchanged." The French police concluded that she was deranged and knew nothing of the murder. In fact, Efron had returned to Moscow under NKVD orders and was held under house arrest in a dacha until he was arrested on 10 December 1937.

Tsvetaeva may not even have known that her husband was a Soviet spy, or the extent to which he was compromised.

Return to the Soviet Union
In 1939, Tsvetaeva and son Georgy returned to Moscow, unaware of the reception she would receive. In Stalin's USSR, anyone who had lived abroad was a suspect, as was anyone who had been among the intelligentsia before the Revolution.

Efron and Alya were arrested for espionage. Alya's fiancé was actually an NKVD agent who had been assigned to spy on the family. Under torture Efron was pressed to give evidence against Tsvetaeva, but he refused to testify against her or anyone else. His daughter, however, confessed under beatings that her father was a Trotskyite spy, which led to his execution. Efron was shot in 1941; Alya served over eight years in prison. Both were exonerated after Stalin's death.

In 1941, Tsvetaeva and her son were evacuated to Yelabuga. On 31 August 1941, while living in Yelabuga (Elabuga), Tsvetaeva hanged herself.

References

NKVD
1893 births
1941 deaths
Soviet Jews
Soviet male writers
Soviet poets
Jewish poets
20th-century Russian male writers
Writers from Moscow
Moscow State University alumni
Soviet emigrants to Germany
German emigrants to Czechoslovakia
Czechoslovak emigrants to France
Jews executed by the Soviet Union